Oscar Peterson and Clark Terry is a 1975 album by Oscar Peterson and Clark Terry.

Track listing 
 "(I'd Like to Get You on a) Slow Boat to China" (Frank Loesser) – 4:24
 "But Beautiful" (Sonny Burke, Jimmy Van Heusen) – 4:44
 "Shaw 'Nuff" (Ray Brown, Gil Fuller, Dizzy Gillespie) – 4:29
 "Satin Doll" (Duke Ellington, Johnny Mercer, Billy Strayhorn) – 7:13
 "Chops" (Oscar Peterson, Clark Terry) – 4:48
 "Makin' Whoopee" (Walter Donaldson, Gus Kahn) – 5:56
 "No Flugel Blues" (Peterson, Terry) – 5:38
 "Mack the Knife" (Marc Blitzstein, Bertolt Brecht, Kurt Weill) – 4:34

Personnel 
 Oscar Peterson – piano
 Clark Terry – trumpet

References 

1975 albums
Oscar Peterson albums
Clark Terry albums
Pablo Records albums
Albums produced by Norman Granz